Bandar-e Bostanu (also Romanized as Bandar-e Bostānū; also known as Bastaneh, Bostāneh, Bostānū, Bustani, Būstānu, and Postānū) is a village in Behdasht Rural District, Kushk-e Nar District, Parsian County, Hormozgan Province, Iran. At the 2006 census, its population was 642, in 119 families.

References 

Populated places in Parsian County